Alenka Čebašek (born 24 April 1989) is a Slovenian cross-country skier. She competed at the 2014 Winter Olympics in Sochi.

Cross-country skiing results
All results are sourced from the International Ski Federation (FIS).

Olympic Games

World Championships

World Cup

Season standings

References

1989 births
Living people
Cross-country skiers at the 2014 Winter Olympics
Cross-country skiers at the 2018 Winter Olympics
Olympic cross-country skiers of Slovenia
Slovenian female cross-country skiers
Tour de Ski skiers
Sportspeople from Kranj